Donato Raffaele Sbarretti Tazza (November 1856 – 1 April 1939)  was an Italian Roman Catholic Cardinal whose career included pastoral service in Italy and Cuba, diplomatic service in America and the Pacific, and ultimately high office in the Roman Curia.

Biography
Born in Montefranco di Spoleto, Sbarretti was educated and first served in the archdiocese of Spoleto.

His uncle, Enea Sbarretti, was named a Cardinal in 1877, two years before Donato was ordained a priest at the age of 22. However, Donato Sbarretti's career advancement cannot be ascribed to nepotism; his uncle's longtime patron Pope Pius IX had died before Donato even became a priest, and his uncle died in 1884, when Donato's career was barely underway.

In 1893, after pastoral work, teaching, and minor curial staff positions, such as a minutante at Propaganda, Sbarretti was made canon of a church in Rome and posted to the United States as auditor in the apostolic delegation. In 1895 he was named a privy chamberlain, then the lowest grade of monsignor.

His next postings were results of the aftermath of the Spanish–American War, as he was named Bishop of Havana in 1900, serving only briefly, before the Holy See named him Apostolic Delegate Extraordinary to settle an urgent matter in the Philippines. The United States Government refused to allow him to take up this posting because they wanted to negotiate this issue with their own special mission to the Vatican under William Howard Taft. Before the end of 1902 Sbarretti was sent to Canada as Apostolic Delegate and remained there until recalled to Rome in 1910.

In 1916 Pope Benedict XV elevated Sbarretti to the cardinalate as Cardinal-Priest of San Silvestro in Capite. Then serving as Assessor of the Sacred Congregation of the Holy Office, he became Prefect of the Sacred Congregation of the council (predecessor of today's Congregation for the Clergy) in 1919. A Cardinal Bishop after 1928, he finally became Secretary of the Holy Office (today's Congregation for the Doctrine of the Faith), of which the Pope then personally served as Prefect in 1930, and Vice-Dean of the Sacred College of Cardinals in 1935.

He died less than a month after participating in the conclave that elected Pope Pius XII, and according to his will was buried in the parish church of Montefranco, where he had been born.

Notes

1856 births
1939 deaths
People from the Province of Terni
20th-century Italian cardinals
Cardinal-bishops of Sabina
20th-century Italian Roman Catholic archbishops
Apostolic Nuncios to Canada
Apostolic Nuncios to the Philippines
Members of the Holy Office
Members of the Sacred Congregation of the Council
Pontifical Roman Seminary alumni
Roman Catholic bishops of Havana